The following is a list of former Judges of the Supreme Court of India since its inception on 26 January 1950. A total of 232 judges have served in the court (excluding sitting judges). The list has been arranged on the basis of date of retirement with Chief Justices mentioned first.

Former Chief Justices

Former Judges

See also
 List of chief justices of India
 List of sitting judges of the Supreme Court of India
 List of female judges of the Supreme Court of India

References

External links 

Chief justice & Judges
Former Justices

Judges,Former
Supreme Court of India,Judges,Sitting